The Automobile Club of France (ACF) is a men's club founded on November 12, 1895 by Albert de Dion, Paul Meyan, and its first president, the Dutch-born Baron Etienne van Zuylen van Nijevelt.

The Automobile Club of France, also known in French as "ACF" or "l'Auto", was initially located near the Paris Opera and benefited from a villa in the Bois de Boulogne. In 1898, the club moved to the exceptional site of the former "Place Louis XV" (currently Place de la Concorde) in order to offer its members more comfort in a prestigious setting. The club still occupies more than 10,000 square meters in the Hotels du Plessis-Bellière and Moreau, both located between the Hôtel de Crillon and the Hôtel de Coislin, where France signed a treaty by which it became the first nation ever to recognize the independence of the United States.

The members of the Automobile Club of France enjoy several lounges, a swimming pool, a gym, a library containing more than 50,000 references, a movie theatre, bars, and dining rooms. Numerous activities are offered, including yoga, squash, shooting, billiards, and fencing. The facilities also include a hair salon and a travel agency.

On January 16, 1906, the French Automobile Club licensed the département of Sarthe to organize an auto race. Their historical action marked the beginning of the 24 Hours of Le Mans and the French Grand Prix. Organized Grand Prix motor racing evolved to become the Paris-based Formula One organization. The 100th anniversary of the event was marked by the government of France issuing a commemorative coin.

From 1906 to 1914 the Club regulated major races in France and established the rules for the annual national race dubbed a Grand Prix that was open to competitors from any country. World War I disrupted racing in France until 1921 at which time the national event returned under the official name "ACF Grand Prix" (French: Grand Prix de l'A.C.F.). This name was used until 1967 when it was changed to French Grand Prix.

Today, the club maintains its head office and facilities on the Place de la Concorde in Paris.

Eminent members
 François Bujon de l'Estang, former French ambassador to the United States
 Michel David-Weill, former head of Lazard Frères in Paris and New York
 Jean-Martin Folz, former CEO of Peugeot
 Carlos Ghosn, former chairman & CEO of Renault and Nissan
 Alain-Dominique Perrin, CEO of Richemont
 Roland Peugeot, former chairman of Peugeot
 Baron Guy de Rothschild
 Baron Ernest-Antoine Seilliere de Laborde, CEO of Wendel and former head of Medef
 Frantz Taittinger
 Gérard Wertheimer, co-owner of Chanel

Key people
Louis Desanges, President of the Automobile Club de France
Vincent Dutertre, General Director of the Automobile Club de France

References

Auto racing organizations in France
1895 establishments in France
Sports organizations established in 1895